The Ninth Menzies ministry (Liberal–Country Coalition) was the 39th ministry of the Government of Australia. It was led by the country's 12th Prime Minister, (Sir) Robert Menzies. The Ninth Menzies ministry succeeded the Eighth Menzies ministry, which dissolved on 22 December 1961 following the federal election that took place in early December. The ministry was replaced by the Tenth Menzies ministry on 18 December 1963 following the 1963 federal election.

Allen Fairhall, who died in 2006, was the last surviving member of the Ninth Menzies ministry; Fairhall was also the last surviving member of the Seventh Menzies ministry. Hugh Roberton was the last surviving Country junior minister, and Sir Garfield Barwick and Charles Davidson were the last surviving Liberal and Country Cabinet ministers respectively.

Cabinet

Outer ministry

Notes

Ministries of Elizabeth II
Menzies, 09
1961 establishments in Australia
1963 disestablishments in Australia
Robert Menzies
Cabinets established in 1961
Cabinets disestablished in 1963